Brahmananda Panda (3 April 1949 – 30 January 2010) was a member of the 14th Lok Sabha of India. He represented the Jagatsinghpur constituency of Orissa and is a member of the Biju Janata Dal (BJD) political party.

External links

External links
 Members of Fourteenth Lok Sabha - Parliament of India website

People from Odisha
Biju Janata Dal politicians
India MPs 2004–2009
1949 births
2010 deaths
Lok Sabha members from Odisha
People from Jagatsinghpur district